The 2017 Orange County SC season is the club's seventh season of existence, their third in the United Soccer League, and their first in the second tier of American soccer. This is the club's first year being branded as Orange County SC after previously being known as Orange County Blues FC from 2014 through 2017 and the LA Blues from 2011 to 2014.

Background 
Playing the first season as Orange County SC, the team finished with a record of 11-11-10, 6-6-4 at home.  The team played their first four games away due to the ongoing construction of their temporary stadium at Orange County Great Park, while Championship Soccer Stadium was under construction.  The first home game was week 7, May 6, 2017 against LA Galaxy II, resulting in a 4-0 Orange County victory.  Due to insufficient lighting in the temporary field games started at 5:00 pm PST.

The first game played in the new Championship Soccer Stadium was August 5, 2017 against Tulsa Roughnecks ending in a scoreless draw.

The team finished the season in 10th place in the Western Conference and did not qualify for playoffs, three points behind Sacramento Republic FC in 8th place.

OCSC played three away games for the US Open Cup, defeating FC Golden State Force (5-2) and LA Wolves FC (1-0), before losing to LA Galaxy (1-3) at Dignity Health Sports stadium.

At the conclusion of the season, Head Coach Logan Pause was released, announced Nov 27.

Transfers

In

Loan in

Club 

Preseason exhibitions

Competitive

USL

Table

Results summary

Results by round

Results

U.S. Open Cup

Statistics

Goalscorers

Assists

Clean sheets

References

External links 
 Official Website
 2017 Schedule

2017 USL season
Orange County SC seasons
American soccer clubs 2017 season
2017 in sports in California